South Shore Water Frolics was a free three-day summer festival held annually at South Shore Park in the Bay View neighborhood of Milwaukee, Wisconsin. It featured a parade, live music, and fireworks at the lakefront. 

The event, along with Summerfest and the many ethnic and cultural festivals held throughout the city, is what gives Milwaukee the nickname "City of Festivals".

Description 
Celebrating its 63rd year in 2012, the South Shore Frolics is one of the oldest festivals in Milwaukee. Originally known as the South Shore Water Frolic, it was sponsored by the Bay View Lions Club, which provided a stage and music near the South Shore Yacht Club.

The event kicked off with a parade that runs through the center of the Bay View business district, along Kinnickinnic Avenue from Lincoln Avenue south to Estes, then East to the park. The parade included classic cars, local dignitaries, floats sponsored by local businesses, and competitions involving local high school sports teams, cheerleaders, bands, and organizations. Various park venues staged events such as the annual Classic Car Show and the South Shore Festival of the Arts presented by the Bay View Arts Guild. At the end of each night was the festival's signature Atomic Fireworks display, put on by Bartolotta Fireworks. 

After 68 years of celebrations, South Shore Water Frolics was cancelled. The Bay View Lions Club, which organizes the Frolics, did not hold the event in the summers of 2012, 2015, and 2018, due to lack of donations.

References

External links 
Official event website
Bay View Lions Club
Bay View Arts Guild
Bartolotta web site

Festivals in Milwaukee
South Side, Milwaukee